The Seaboard Villages are three contiguous coastal villages, situated about 10 km southeast of the town of Tain in Easter Ross, Scotland. They face east onto the Moray Firth.

Namely (from North to South):
Hilton of Cadboll - which has the pier
Balintore - which has the harbour
Shandwick - which has the bay

External links
Down to the Sea - online version of history book of Hilton, Balintore, and Shandwick
"Seaboard History Website'' - online archive of the social history of the Seaboard Villages; Hilton, Balintore, and Shandwick

Populated places in Ross and Cromarty